A royal peculiar is a Church of England parish or church exempt from the jurisdiction of the diocese and the province in which it lies, and subject to the direct jurisdiction of the monarch, or in Cornwall by the duke.

Definition
The church parish system dates from Saxon times when most early churches were provided by the lord whose estate land coincided with that of the parish. A donative parish (or "peculiar") was one that was exempt from diocesan jurisdiction. There are several reasons for peculiars but usually they were held by a senior churchman from another district, parish or diocese. They could include the separate or "peculiar" jurisdiction of the monarch, another archbishop or bishop, or the dean and chapter of a cathedral (also, the Knights Templar and the Knights Hospitaller). An archbishop's peculiar is subject to the direct jurisdiction of an archbishop and a royal peculiar is subject to the direct jurisdiction of the monarch.

Most peculiars survived the Reformation but, with the exception of royal peculiars, were finally abolished during the 19th century by various Acts of Parliament and became subject to the jurisdiction of the diocese in which they lay, although a few non-royal peculiars still exist. The majority of royal peculiars that remain are within the Diocese of London.

Present day

London

The Collegiate Church of St Peter, Westminster, commonly known as Westminster Abbey, and containing the Henry VII Chapel, which is the chapel of the Order of the Bath.
The chapels associated with the Chapel Royal, which refers not to a building but to an establishment in the Royal household, a body of priests and singers who explicitly serve the spiritual needs of the sovereign. Curiously, because the Bishop of London is customarily appointed the Dean of the Chapel Royal, the bishop typically has authority of these chapels as dean, but does not have authority over them as bishop even though they are geographically within the Diocese of London.
The Chapel Royal, St James's Palace
The Queen's Chapel, St James's Palace
The Chapel Royal, Hampton Court
The Chapel of St John the Evangelist in the Tower of London
The Chapel of St Peter ad Vincula in the Tower of London
The King's Chapel of the Savoy, inaugurated as a Chapel Royal in November 2016, is a private chapel of the sovereign in right of the Duchy of Lancaster. It is the chapel of the Royal Victorian Order. The number of members of the order in recent years has outgrown the available space in the Savoy Chapel so the service for those who have received awards is now held in St George's Chapel, Windsor Castle every four years.
The Chapel of St Mary Undercroft, the crypt of the former St Stephen's Chapel in the Palace of Westminster. The building is administered through the Lord Great Chamberlain and Black Rod and it has no dedicated clergy: by convention services were conducted by the Rector of St Margaret's, Westminster, a member of the Chapter of Westminster Abbey. In 2010, the Speaker of the House of Commons used his right of appointment of his Chaplain to nominate an outsider, the Revd Rose Hudson-Wilkin.
The Royal Foundation of St Katharine founded in 1147 by Queen Matilda of England as a religious community and medieval hospital for poor infirm people next to the Tower of London
Temple Church, built by the Knights Templar in the City of London

Edinburgh
Chapel Royal, Holyrood Palace

Cambridge
The Church of St Edward, King and Martyr

Windsor
St George's Chapel, Windsor Castle, the Chapel of the Order of the Garter
Royal Chapel of All Saints (in the grounds of the Royal Lodge in Windsor Great Park)

Former royal peculiars
St Michael's Collegiate Church, Penkridge near Wolverhampton
St Michael and All Angels' Church, Tettenhall, Wolverhampton 1247–1548
Canons of Dover Priory, until 1130
Holy Trinity, Minories, London, until 1730
St Mary and St Alkelda, Middleham, North Yorkshire, until 1856
Wimborne Minster, Dorset, 1318–1846
St Peter's Collegiate Church, Wolverhampton, 1479–1846
The Deanery of St Buryan, Cornwall, comprising St Buryan's Church in St Buryan, St Sennen's Church, Sennen, and St Levan's Church, St Levan, until 1850, and was a peculiar under the jurisdiction of the Duchy of Cornwall with the dean appointed by the duke.
The Deanery of Bridgnorth, Shropshire, until 1856
Dorchester Abbey in Dorchester on Thames, Oxfordshire, 1536–1837
The Collegiate Church and Royal Free Chapel of St Mary the Virgin, St Mary's Church, Shrewsbury, until 1856
St Mary's Church, Stafford

Non-royal peculiars
St Mary-le-Bow, City of London
The Parish of Hawarden, Flintshire, Wales
The Parish of Southwick, Hampshire (St James, Southwick and St Nicholas, Boarhunt)
Charterhouse chapel, Islington, London
The Peculiar (or Peculier) of Masham, North Yorkshire
Church of St Mary the Virgin, Hornby, North Yorkshire
Christ Church, Oxford
All college chapels of the University of Oxford
Christ Church, Bath, Somerset
Chapel of St Lawrence, Warminster, Wiltshire; bought by the townspeople in 1574, administered by feoffees

The following chapels of the Inns of Court are extra-diocesan, and therefore peculiars, but not Royal:
Lincoln's Inn Chapel
Gray's Inn Chapel

See also
Exemption (Catholic canon law)
Extra-parochial area
Chapel Royal
Proprietary chapel

Related concepts in secular government
Demesne
Imperial immediacy
Independent city

Notes

Citations

References

External links
Deanery of Westminster – extra-parochial places
Report of Review Group on the Royal Peculiars, 2001
The British Monarchy – Royal Victorian Order
Listing and description from Anglicans Online

Types of church buildings
Church of England
British monarchy